Günther Simon (11 May 1925 – 25 June 1972) was an East German actor.

Biography

Early life 
A bank clerk's son, Simon attended an acting school already in Gymnasium. At the age of 16, he was sent to a premilitary training camp of the Hitler Youth and then drafted to the Reich Labour Service. He volunteered to join the paratroopers in August 1943. He was captured by American troops near Normandy and shipped to a POW camp in Colorado, where he acted in the camp's makeshift theater.

Breakthrough 
After returning home in 1947, Simon took private acting lessons with Karl Meixner in the Hebbel Theater in Berlin. He made his debut on stage in the Municipal Theater of Köthen in 1948, in a production of Dmitry Scheglov's The Storm. He then moved to the Schwerin Theater, in which he remained until 1950; there, he met his wife Margarita, who was employed as a dancer. Afterwards, Simon joined the cast of the Dresden Theater. In late 1951, he left it in favour of the Leipzig Theater, where he remained for only a short period.

Summit 
Simon was cast for one of the leading roles in the 1952 film The Condemned Village, and since then was active mainly in cinema. At the same year, in spite of his inexperience, he was chosen to portray Ernst Thälmann in Kurt Maetzig's two-part propaganda epic about the communist leader's life.  The picture was watched by millions and entered the East German schools' curriculum. Simon received the National Prize first class for his work on the first part, and the Best Actor Award in the 1956 Karlovy Vary International Film Festival for his appearance in the second. He joined the country's Socialist Unity Party of Germany (SED / Sozialistische Einheitspartei Deutschlands) in 1954 and became a member of the DEFA Studio's management.

Simon appeared in some 30 pictures throughout the years. In 1956, he was awarded the Heinrich Greif Prize second class. He won the National Prize once more, in 1968, for his portrayal of Krause in the television miniseries Krause and Krupp, and received the Art Prize of the Free German Trade Union Federation thrice, in 1967, 1968, and 1971. He had three sons and one daughter, and is buried in the Dorotheenstadt cemetery.

Partial filmography 

 Das verurteilte Dorf (1952) – Heinz Weimann
 Anna Susanna (1953) – Orje
 Swings Or Roundabouts (1953) – Ernst
 Ernst Thälmann (1954–1955, part 1, 2) – Ernst Thälmann
 Drei Mädchen im Endspiel (1956)
 Das Traumschiff (1956) – Kapitän Franz Müller
 Treffpunkt Aimée (1956) – Wendt
 Damals in Paris (1956) – Georges
 Tinko (1957) – Ernst Kraske
 Don't Forget My Little Traudel (1957) – The Peoples'-Police Commissar
 Sheriff Teddy (1957) – Lehrer Freitag
 My Wife Makes Music (1958) – Gustl Wagner
 Cerný prapor (1958) – Gerhardt
 Der Lotterieschwede (1958) – Arzt
 The Sailor's Song (1958) – Erich Steigert
 Geschwader Fledermaus (1958) – Tex Stankowsky
 Sun Seekers (1958) – Franz Beier
 Der kleine Kuno (1959) – Verkehrspolizist
 Senta auf Abwegen (1959) – Max Matuschek
 Eine alte Liebe (1959) – 1. Sekretär der SED-Kreiparteileitung
 First Spaceship on Venus (1960) – Deutscher Pilot / Robert / Raimund Brinkmann
 Einer von uns (1960) – Richard Bertram
 Die heute über 40 sind (1960) – Vertreter des NKFD
 Kein Ärger mit Cleopatra (1960) – LPG-Vorsitzender
 Der Moorhund (1960) – Oberleutnant Suter
 Die Liebe und der Co-Pilot (1961) – Richard Wagner
 Der Fremde (1961) – Reichert
 Der Traum des Hauptmann Loy (1961) – First Lt. Phil A. Rodney
 Der Tod hat ein Gesicht (1961) – Dr. Cramm
 Eine Handvoll Noten (1961) – Paul Steinmetz
 The Dress (1961) – Fleischer
 Ärzte (1961) – Dr. Brehm
 Mord ohne Sühne (1962) – Heinz Lippert
 An französischen Kaminen (1962) – General Rucker
 Nebel (1963) – Verteidiger
 At A French Fireside (1963) – SS-Gruppenführer Upitz
 Schwarzer Samt (1964) – Manfred Sibelka
 Preludio 11 (1964) – Palomino
 Das Lied vom Trompeter (1964) – Ernst Thälmann
 Der Reserveheld (1965) – Genosse Oberst
 Lots Weib (1965) – Richard Lot
 Der Frühling braucht Zeit (1965) – Erhard Faber
 Alfons Zitterbacke (1966) – Vater Zitterbacke
 Reise ins Ehebett (1966) – Kapitän
 Bread and Roses (1967) – Georg Landau
 Heroin (1968) – Zollkommissar Zinn
 Verdacht auf einen Toten (1969) – Major Klausnitzer
 Weil ich dich liebe (1970) – Paul Wienecke
 KLK Calling PTZ – The Red Orchestra (1971) – John Sieg
 Nakovalnya ili chuk (1972) – Pfarrer
 Ripe Cherry (1973) – Helmut Kamp
 Wenn du groß bist, lieber Adam (1990) – Minister (final film role)

References

External links 

 
 

1925 births
1972 deaths
Male actors from Berlin
German male stage actors
German male film actors
German male television actors
Socialist Unity Party of Germany members
German prisoners of war in World War II held by the United States
Recipients of the National Prize of East Germany
Recipients of the Heinrich Greif Prize
20th-century German male actors
Hitler Youth members
Reich Labour Service members
Fallschirmjäger of World War II